The 2006 Misano Superbike World Championship round was the sixth round of the 2006 Superbike World Championship. It took place on the weekend of June 23–25, 2006 at the Misano Adriatico circuit.

Results

Superbike race 1 classification

Superbike race 2 classification

Supersport race classification

References
 Superbike Race 1
 Superbike Race 2
 Supersport Race

Misano Round
Misano Superbike